Guram Gedekhauri (born 24 October 1963) is a Soviet wrestler. He competed in the men's Greco-Roman 100 kg at the 1988 Summer Olympics.

Gedekhauri is the father of Zurabi Gedekhauri who is also a Greco-Roman wrestler.

References

External links
 

1963 births
Living people
Soviet male sport wrestlers
Olympic wrestlers of the Soviet Union
Wrestlers at the 1988 Summer Olympics
People from Kvemo Kartli